The 2015 Persija Jakarta season is the seventh season competing in the Indonesia Super League for Persija Jakarta.

Review and events

Pre–2015

Matches

Legend

Friendlies

Indonesia Super League

Statistics

Squad 
.

|}

Clean sheets 
As of 7 April 2015.

Disciplinary record 
As of 7 April 2015.

Transfers

In

Out

Notes 
1.Persija Jakarta's goals first.

References

External links 
 2015 Persija Jakarta season at ligaindonesia.co.id 
 2015 Persija Jakarta season at soccerway.com

Persija Jakarta
Persija Jakarta seasons